Thomas Frank (born 1965) is an American political commentator.

Thomas (or Tommy or Tom) Frank''' may also refer to:
 Thomas Frank (priest) (died 1731), English priest
 Thomas Peirson Frank (1881–1951), British civil engineer and surveyor
 Thomas Frank (football manager) (born 1973), Danish football manager
 Thomas Hilbourne Frank (born 1932), politician from Antigua and Barbuda
 Tommy Frank (born 1993), British boxer

See also
Thomas Franck (disambiguation)

Thomas Franke (born 1988), German footballer
Thomas Franke (drummer), drummer with U.D.O., a German heavy metal band